Frances Fuller was an American actress.

Frances Fuller may also refer to:

Frances Fuller (writer), American historian and novelist

See also
Francis Fuller (disambiguation)